El Deseo de Oír Tu Voz is the fourth studio album recorded by Mexican singer-songwriter Cristian Castro. It was released by Fonovisa on 23 January 1996. It was the last album to be released under label. The album was produced by Daniel Freiberg, A.B. Quintanilla III and Andrés Calamaro. The song, Morelia, was previously used as the main theme for the telenovela of the same name and was also previously released on Castro's 1994 album El Camino del Alma. Amarte a Tí and Amor both reached number one Hot Latin Tracks in 1996.

Track listing

Columbia Edition

Chart performance

References

1996 albums
Cristian Castro albums
Fonovisa Records albums
Spanish-language albums
Albums produced by A.B. Quintanilla